Phyllacanthus is a genus of echinoderms belonging to the family Cidaridae.

The genus has almost cosmopolitan distribution.

Species:

Phyllacanthus clarkii 
Phyllacanthus dubius 
Phyllacanthus duncani 
Phyllacanthus forcipulatus 
Phyllacanthus imperialis 
Phyllacanthus irregularis 
Phyllacanthus javanus 
Phyllacanthus longispinus 
Phyllacanthus magnificus 
Phyllacanthus parvispinus 
Phyllacanthus priscus 
Phyllacanthus serratus 
Phyllacanthus suleimani 
Phyllacanthus texanus 
Phyllacanthus titan 
Phyllacanthus tylotus 
Phyllacanthus tysoni 
Phyllacanthus wellmanae

References

Cidaridae
Echinoidea genera